Sandro Rudan (born 23 January 1953) is a Yugoslav former swimmer. He competed in two events at the 1972 Summer Olympics.

References

External links
 

1953 births
Living people
Yugoslav male swimmers
Olympic swimmers of Yugoslavia
Swimmers at the 1972 Summer Olympics
Place of birth missing (living people)
Mediterranean Games silver medalists for Yugoslavia
Mediterranean Games medalists in swimming
Swimmers at the 1975 Mediterranean Games